The 2018–19 Cypriot Third Division was the 48th season of the Cypriot third-level football league. Digenis Akritas Morphou won their 2nd title.

Format
Sixteen teams participated in the 2018–19 Cypriot Third Division. All teams played against each other twice, once at their home and once away. The team with the most points at the end of the season crowned champions. The first four teams promoted to the 2019–20 Cypriot Second Division and the last four teams relegated to the 2019–20 STOK Elite Division.

Point system
Teams received three points for a win, one point for a draw and zero points for a loss.

Changes from previous season
Teams promoted to 2018–19 Cypriot Second Division
 Onisilos Sotira
 MEAP Nisou
 Akritas Chlorakas

Teams relegated from 2017–18 Cypriot Second Division
 P.O. Xylotymbou
  Ethnikos Assia
 Chalkanoras Idaliou

Teams promoted from 2017–18 STOK Elite Division
 Kouris Erimis
 Omonia Psevda
 Amathus Ayiou Tychona

Teams relegated to 2018–19 STOK Elite Division
 APEP FC
 Finikas Ayias Marinas Chrysochous
 Livadiakos/Salamina Livadion

Stadiums and locations

League standings

Results

See also
 Cypriot Third Division
 2018–19 Cypriot First Division
 2018–19 Cypriot Second Division

References

Cypriot Third Division seasons
2018–19 in Cypriot football
Cyprus